The Panamerican Draughts Championship is competition in international draughts. It held every two years. The winner of championship and next two or three players automatically classified into the Draughts World Championship in international draughts.

First championship was in 1980. The winner was Bernard Robillard from Haiti.

Iser Kuperman from USA and Allan Silva from Brazil have four titles.

First womens championship was in 2018. The winner was Lublyana Turiy from United States.

Results

Blitz

Women

References

External links
Site FMJD. American Champions (100)
Panamerikaans Kampioenschap toernooibase.kndb

Panamerican Championship winners
International sports championships in the Americas